Albolagh (also Romanized as Albolāgh; also known as Albolāg and ‘Alībulāgh) is a village in Rob-e Shamat Rural District, Sheshtomad District, Sabzevar County, Razavi Khorasan Province, Iran. At the 2006 census, its population was 487, in 120 families.

References 

Populated places in Sabzevar County